The 1967–68 FIBA European Cup Winners' Cup was the second edition of FIBA's 2nd-tier level European-wide professional club basketball competition, contested between national domestic cup champions, running from November 1967, to 4 April 1968. 22 teams took part in the competition, three more than in the inaugural edition.

AEK defeated 1966 FIBA European Champions Cup runner-up Slavia VŠ Praha, in the final, which for the first time was held as a single match, to become the competition's first Greek League champion. They previously defeated defending champion, Ignis Varese, in the semifinals.

In the final between AEK and Slavia VŠ Praha, which took place in Pangrati, Athens, at Panathenaic Stadium, the seated attendance was 80,000, and the standing attendance, in and around the arena, was 40,000 (for a total of 120,000).

Participants

First round

|}

Second round

|}

Automatically qualified to the quarter finals
 Ignis Varese (title holder)

Quarterfinals

|}

Semifinals

|}

Finals
April 4, Panathenaic "Kalimarmaro" Stadium, Athens

|}

References

External links 
FIBA European Cup Winner's Cup 1967–68 linguasport.com
FIBA European Cup Winner's Cup 1967–68

Cup
FIBA Saporta Cup